USS Tranquillity (AH-14) was a  in the service of the United States Navy during World War II.

Built as Marine Dolphin in 1943 by Sun Shipbuilding & Drydock Co. under Maritime Commission contract, she was renamed Tranquillity on 22 June 1944; launched on 25 July 1944; sponsored by Miss Carol P. Meekins; acquired by the Navy from the Maritime Commission on 14 August 1944; converted into a hospital ship at New York City by the Atlantic Basin Iron Works; and commissioned on 24 April 1945.

With a bed capacity of 802 and a complement of 568, Tranquillity was one of the first six fully air conditioned ships in the Navy.

Tranquillity got underway from Hampton Roads on 5 May 1945 for shakedown trials and assignment to the Pacific Fleet to provide hospital services, consultation, preventive medicine and casualty evacuation. Tranquillity was then assigned to assist the 3rd Fleet by returning 766 patients from Guam to the US. On 26 September 1945 she was assigned to Operation Magic Carpet to return troops from overseas to the US and was designated APH-114.

On 25 March 1946 Tranquillity was designated AH-14 and was decommissioned, in reserve, on 16 July 1956.  She was struck from the Naval Register on 1 September 1961.

On 15 July 1974, Tranquillity was sold for scrapping to Northern Metal Co., Division of North James River Associates for $58,300.00 (PD-X-395 dated 5 June 1947) Withdrawn from the Suisun Bay Reserve Fleet and delivered to Northern Metals, 5 August 1974

Tranquillity received one battle star for World War II service.

References

External links
 Photo gallery at navsource.org

 

1944 ships
Haven-class hospital ships
Ships built by the Sun Shipbuilding & Drydock Company
World War II auxiliary ships of the United States